Michael Gamble (born January 5, 1994) is an American soccer player who plays as a forward.

Career

College and amateur
Gamble played four years of college soccer at Wake Forest University between 2012 and 2015. While at college, he appeared for Premier Development League side Baltimore Bohemians during their 2013 season.

Professional
On January 14, 2016, Gamble was drafted 30th overall in the 2016 MLS SuperDraft by New England Revolution. He made his professional debut while on loan to New England's United Soccer League affiliate Rochester Rhinos, appearing in a 0-0 draw with New York Red Bulls II on April 17, 2016. Gamble was waived by New England on June 13, 2016.

On January 13, 2020, Gamble signed with Loudoun United.

References

External links
 

1994 births
Living people
American soccer players
Association football forwards
Baltimore Bohemians players
FC Tulsa players
Loudoun United FC players
New England Revolution draft picks
New England Revolution players
People from Columbia, Maryland
Rochester New York FC players
Soccer players from Maryland
Sportspeople from the Baltimore metropolitan area
USL Championship players
USL League Two players
Wake Forest Demon Deacons men's soccer players
Deportes Santa Cruz footballers
American expatriate soccer players
Expatriate footballers in Chile
American expatriate sportspeople in Chile